Slavery in New France was practiced by some of the indigenous populations, which enslaved outsiders as captives in warfare, until European colonization that made commercial chattel slavery become common in New France. By 1750, two-thirds of the enslaved peoples in New France were indigenous, and by 1834, most enslaved people were black.

The institution, which endured for almost two centuries, affected thousands of men, women, and children descended from indigenous and African peoples. It also impacted many indigenous people, who were used as domestic servants and traded as goods.

Indigenous origin of slavery France 

The existence of slavery in this region predates the arrival of Europeans and had major impact on the way the system of slavery progressed during French colonization. Entrenched in a culture of war, indigenous groups of the Pays d'en Haut relied extensively on warfare that focused on captive-taking, rather than killing. These captives would then be processed, often through a brutal series of events designed to strip the individual of any identifications from prior groups and also supplying lasting demarcations and scarring to signify the individual's captive status to others in the community.

The process of integration was often cruel and life-threatening and included acts such as the cutting off of fingers or other extremities, nails being torn out, nose cropping, and beatings. The ritual of captive integration was a public affair, which involved all sections of native society, including women and children, whose participation was particularly poignant in solidifying the status of the slave, often a captured male warrior, in his new community. Those surviving being beaten and marked would then undergo humiliating acts, such as undressing and forced singing, to erase former identities further before they were reintegrated into their new community or were ritually tortured and executed. Once part of the community, captives served distinct social functions within it. Generally, slaves were not typically seen as freely-transferable property and trade goods as traditionally seen in modes of chattel slavery. Instead, slaves were intended to serve the social role of a lost community member: when one member would be murdered or taken from the community, a captive would be provided to take that member's place and assume her or his roles. That often meant that the position of the slave was gendered in a way that pushed men to take on traditionally-female tasks, such as serving meals, providing farm labor, preparing skins, and carrying packs when hunting. Female captives were often used as secondary "chore" wives, who were used for routine household acts as well as providing reproductive labour.

Politically, there was also considerable value in these captive-taking rituals. Captives' unique positions as social intermediaries allowed them to provide diplomatic services, such as translation. Able to act as symbolic gifts between peoples, slave trading added social and political weight to indigenous relations, linking separate regions' peoples to one another through ethnic and linguistic boundaries. Often being seized from one group, integrated into another, and then exchanged to still others, they had capacities to act as cultural coordinators, which highlighted the utility of the indigenous slave trade and the degree to which indigenous captives may have been able to exercise autonomy within their servitude.

French-indigenous patterns of enslavement 

Clearly established prior to the French arrival, a system of slavery was well underway. The French practice of slavery, therefore, existed more as an adaptation to an existing system rather than the imposition of a new system upon indigenous peoples and spaces. Slavery was adopted by French settlers in earnest beginning in 1632, continuing after the Conquest of New France in the 18th century. Initially, slavery in the colony was complicated by France's ethical stance on the matter: slave ownership in New France was not legally recognized (as per their free-soil doctrine), but it could still be justified with the understanding that only the act of enslaving people was deemed unethical and simply buying or receiving slaves was accepted. Hoping to mimic the economic success of other colonies, France's royal administration gave in to Canadian pressures from slave-purchasing colonial officials, and issued the Raudot Ordinance of 1709, putting into law a legitimacy of enslavement within the St. Lawrence Valley colonial setting.

On 13 April 1709, New France intendant Jacques Raudot passed the Ordinance Rendered on the Subject of the Negroes and the Savages Called Panis, legalizing the purchase and possession of indigenous slaves in New France. When Raudot pronounced indigenous slavery to be legal in New France, the practice had already been well established in the Native and French alliances throughout the seventeenth and eighteenth centuries. After the 1709 Ordinance came into effect, slavery in the colony grew exponentially. Natives flooded the slave market in the course of intense diplomacy with the French to prevent colonial encroachment of Native land. Therefore, the flood of Native slaves in St. Lawrence largely came from their Western counterparts. According to Rushforth, "by narrowing the target to a specific set of victims known as the 'Panis nation,' Raudot and his successors created a North American counterpart to the African kingdom of Nigritie: a distant and populous nation at war with more proximate allies, poorly understood but identified as legally and morally enslavable". Effectively, this meant Western Natives were strengthening future adversaries in the east, with their own slaves, in a struggle to preserve their land. 
French settlers primarily acquired slaves through the process of ritualized gift-giving commonly used to facilitate diplomatic negotiations. However French hunger for more slaves altered indigenous practices of captive-taking and enslavement. Warfare focusing on captive taking increased, as captives became not just a way to symbolically replace lost relatives, but also became economically valuable goods to exchange with the French. Networks of alliances between indigenous groups helped funnel captives towards the French.

The exchange of slaves and different understandings about the nature of slavery also had real impacts on French relationships with their native neighbors.  Protracted conflicts, such as the Fox Wars, were largely encouraged because war captives provided an ample source of new slaves. Indigenous nations allied to the French and antagonistic to the Fox used this incentive to leverage French military support. At other times, different conceptions of slavery stood in the way of relationships. Denonville's decision to send 40 captured Iroquois to France as galley slaves proved to be a major roadblock to future peace negotiations between the French and the Iroquois. Similarly, diplomatic talks with Sioux chiefs in 1742 were marred by the presence of Sioux slaves who had ended up in French possession.

African slave trade in New France 

African slaves in New France were a minority in relation to both African slaves within New France and throughout all "New World" slave holdings. Out of the roughly 3.8 million slaves who had been transported from Western Africa to the Americas by the 1750s, only about 1,400 ended up in New France. Similarly, African slaves were continuously outnumbered by the enslaved indigenous population that formed the majority of the forced-labor force in New France. While exact figures are hard to reconstruct, an estimate of slave populations in 1759, on the eve of Conquest of 1760 suggests a total of around 4000 slaves, of which around 1200 were African. It was in 1632 that the first recorded black slave, Olivier Le Jeune, arrived in New France. It would take more than 50 years later for the next black slave to appear in records, despite strong efforts to augment the numbers of black slaves. Several attempts were made throughout the history of New France to increase the number of African slaves brought to the colony to increase the available workforce. Attempts to increase the economic output of mines, fisheries, and farms were frustrated by the lack of workers. There was much concern that the introduction of African enslavement in Canada would be a costly economic option, citing the major differences in climate as the main reason for its possible failure. Nevertheless, the Governor, Marquis de Denonville, petitioned Louis XIV in 1688 for permission to import African slaves into New France to help establish a colonial economy more closely based on that of France's Caribbean colonies. In May 1689, permission was granted by the King to begin the import of black slaves. However, the number of African slaves remained quite low; colonial records show that there were only eleven African slaves in New France between 1689 and 1709. Later calls to increase the importation of African Slaves to New France also echoed the example of other European colonies that relied on slave labor.  For example Michel Begon argued in 1716 that New France should try to emulate the Thirteen Colonies in their use of slaves.

However, attempts at modeling New France on other colonies were frustrated both by historical accidents and changing colonial policy. While Louis XIV's authorization of slave imports to New France in response to Denonville's request was granted, the start of the Nine Years' War prevented the establishment of continual trade. A similar authorization in 1701 was curtailed by the outbreak of the Seven Years' War. Beyond the difficulties of establishing slave trading networks in New France, economic factors further hindered their development; New France had less potential for high-profit plantation agriculture compared to other colonies, and the availability of indigenous slaves generally meant that there were fewer profitable opportunities for selling slaves in New France.

Royal Edict of 1685
The Code Noir (Black Code) was essentially designed for (black) African slaves whom the French had used extensively in the French Caribbean colonies since 1685. It was composed of 60 articles and was meant to offer some protection to slaves. The Code, moreover, extended toward "Panis" slaves in New France, but its legal application and enforcement remained limited due to the close relationship between the French and the native tribes.

The Code outlined the rights and obligations of both slaves and their owners. Slaves could not make contracts, own land, testify, or be sentenced publicly. Because they did not have the status of a civil individual, slaves could not be charged criminally as citizens. If slaves were found to have physically harmed or damaged something or someone, the owner or owners were financially and personally responsible for the damages caused. If the owner failed to pay for the damages, his slave could be forcefully removed from his possession.

The owner, additionally, had the right to whip or chain his slave. However, it was illegal to mutilate, kill, or torture slaves. Although the Code classified slaves as objects much like a piece of furniture, the owners, nevertheless, had obligations toward their slaves. They were required to feed, clothe, care for in case of injury or sickness, and provide for aging and crippled slaves.

With regards to births and marriages, under the Black Code, there was no legal recognition of the father's situation; a marriage between a free man and a slave woman was not legally recognized. A child born from a free man and a slave woman was considered a slave child; a child born from a free man and free slave woman, in contrast, was a free child.

In 1724, modifications were made to the Black Code. After its revision, the Code "insisted on the basic humanity of the slave: each was to be instructed, baptized, and ministered unto as a Christian, families were to be recognized, and freed slaves were to receive the rights of common citizens—in theory, the African could aspire to become a Frenchman". In practice, nevertheless, there was a huge gap between the laws written in the Black Code and reality since the large majority of French colonists ignored the existence of the document. It was an exception, moreover, for a slave to become free. And while it has been argued that the French were more lenient and tolerant towards their slaves, in comparison to other European planters, the living conditions and treatment of slaves, however, were still determined by the attitude of their owners.

Regional characteristics of slavery

Slavery in the Illinois Country 
The Illinois Country was a French colonial settlement situated in the Mississippi Valley. Although newcomers to the region, the Illinois were an influential Algonquian group who were heavily engaged in slave trade practices with the French and with indigenous allies. Given that their economy primarily revolved around bison hunting, the Illinois tribes required a lot of manpower which they mostly received from slaves. Bison was not only a staple diet for the Illinois but was also integrated in their material culture.

Female slaves were delegated tedious tasks such as processing and drying the meat as well as using bison skins for decorative purposes, clothing, and diplomatic gifts. It required wives and female slaves to cooperate and divide the work amongst each other.

Yet slavery did not only serve economic needs in the Illinois country as it also served cultural purposes. For one, the slave trade allowed the Illinois to strengthen its relationship with the French and other indigenous allies. They would raid and take captives from their enemies, namely the Foxes, and offer them as gifts to the French. The trading of slaves was a ritualized performance that reinforced kinship alliance between the French and the Illinois. The French, in turn, accepted the slaves and baptized them—stripping them of their ethnic and cultural identity in an effort to Christianize them. Not surprisingly, the taking of captives often led to violent retaliations, namely from the Foxes. Longstanding animosity between the Illinois and the Foxes placed the French in a compromising position. While the French were eager to move westward and trade with the Foxes, they needed to consider their kinship alliance with the Illinois and other indigenous groups in the Great Lakes region. To demand the Illinois to relinquish their captives to the Foxes was to offend them but to ask the Foxes to seek new captives in distant regions was to doubly offend the Illinois since it threatens their position as trusted middlemen to the French. Moreover, the French were reluctant to stop the Illinois from taking captives seeing as they benefited from the Fox slave trade. Thus, inasmuch as the slave trade strengthened alliances between the Illinois and the French, it also soured relationships which led to intermittent retaliatory campaigns.

The French introduced legalized slavery of Africans under the Code Noir in New France. After the port of New Orleans was founded in 1718 with access to the plantation colonies of the Caribbean, French colonists imported increased numbers of African slaves to the Illinois Country for use as mining or agricultural laborers. By the mid-eighteenth century, slaves accounted for as many as a third of the limited population in that rural area.

Slavery on Île-Royale
The Louisbourg in the colony of Île-Royale (Cape Breton & Prince Edward Island) is one city of New France with official records of a black slave community. Louisbourg was an important trading port for the colony because of its key geographical location. It was the midpoint between Europe and France's Caribbean colonies, and was not so subject to sea ice as the settlements to the west. Its economy depended on fishing, the military and trade. It is believed that hundreds of black slaves traveled through the port aboard merchant vessels; only 216 black individuals, nevertheless, were actually enslaved on Ile Royale. The majority of these slaves were the property of the wealthiest individuals of Ile Royale: merchants, government and military officials. Owning slaves increased one's living conditions and social status within the colony.

The slaves of Ile Royale had very different backgrounds as some came from the Dutch West Indies while others directly came from Guinea. However, despite not having the same heritage or ethnicity, they had the common experience of being slaves. What is interesting about Ile Royale is that slaves on the island had a variety of occupations that included being servants, gardeners, bakers, tavern keepers, stonemasons, soldiers, sailors, fisherman and hospital workers. What is most important about this specific part of the French colony of New France is that the enslaved blacks became citizens of the community; not only were they mothers and fathers who became part of a growing African-French colonial culture but they also helped shape colonial life, too.

Slavery in Louisiana

Although Louisiana was established much later than other colonies within New France in 1699, it still acquired blacks far more quickly than Canada as it had the advantage of being closer to the Caribbean market. It also had the opportunity to exploit the native market of the vast Mississippi valley. In Louisiana, plantation owners preferred African slaves; some still kept natives as maids, nevertheless.

Some Panis were enslaved by the beginning of the 18th century, even though it was prohibited officially. These slaves were captured by other native tribes during conflicts and then sold to the French.

In 1717, John Law advised the Mississippi Company to import black slaves into Louisiana to develop the economy with plantations. Around 6,000 black slaves were brought in between 1719 and 1743. Some slaves were sent to the Illinois Country, in Upper Louisiana, New France, a part of French North America, to work in the plantation fields and lead mines.

The Black Code regulated the condition of the slaves just like in the other French colonies, aside from Canada. The Black Code, nevertheless, was not highly respected and slaves enjoyed relative autonomy. During their days off, for example, slaves could cultivate a piece of land and then sell their produce. Others would hunt, log wood, or take care of cattle; all of these actives could occur far from the plantation. Even though interracial marriages and gatherings of slaves was prohibited, both of these practices were nonetheless recorded. Despite this small window of freedom, the lives and work of slaves remained extremely difficult. Harvest period was the most disagreeable season for them. Their belongings, in addition, were sparse and usually only consisted of a few personal items. Still, slave rebellions were rare during the French colonial period.

The slaves also contributed to the creolization of this part of the colony. Even if the Black Code mandated that slaves receive a Christian education, most continued their native practices.

Slavery in Canada

Thousands of people were legally held as slaves in Canada during the colonial period, used as status symbols and servants for wealthy individuals, the local government, and religious organizations including the Grey Nuns. Black slaves exploited by the French were brought from other colonies like Martinique or captured from African regions like Madagascar.

Personal experiences of slaves in Canada 

Treatment of slaves in Canada varied depending on whether the captive was enslaved by an indigenous group or enslaved by a colonial settler. For example, when faced with a declining population, the Iroquois were known to organize a war party and take captives to replace the deceased. Customarily, the captive would undergo a ritualized form of torture, a process that was meant to break down the captive's previous social identity before he/she were fully integrated in their adoptive clan. Although the captive was considered an adoptive kin, disfigurements such as a mutilated nose or missing fingers marked them as captives. Yet an account from the Jesuit missionary, Father Isaac Jogues, seems to suggest that revenge and humiliation were also reasons for taking and torturing captives. He details the ways in which his Iroquois abductors repeatedly beat him with war clubs, tore his fingernails and burned his arms and thighs. Women and youth also had their fill of torturing Father Jogues by beating him with iron rods and yanking out his thumbs.

Captive taking was also practiced among other indigenous groups and that some rituals of humiliation and torture were not always as ghastly as the ones endured by Father Jogues. Louis Hennepin, for example, was another French missionary who recorded his experience as a captive among the Sioux. Even though he was ceremoniously adopted by the war chief Aquipaguetin to replace his deceased son, he suffered physical abuse and ridicule from his captors until he was released. Although he did not experience the same horrors as Father Jogues, his meals were rationed to keep him weak and dependent. By contrast, French slave-owners did not subject their slaves to undue forms of torture as European understanding of kinship and adoption were radically different from that of indigenous peoples. Instead, many slave-owners opted to baptize their slaves and christen them with a new name. Those who wished to keep the origins of their slave a secret requested that their slave be identified as "panis" on their baptismal records. However, some slave-owners delayed the baptism of their slaves while others never bothered to baptize them at all. For example, slave-owner Desmoulins baptized Thomas, his black slave, at the age of sixty while Phillippe Vinet-Préville baptized his slave on the day of her death at the age of fifty-five.

Due to their lowly status, many official documents have neglected to specify the kinds of jobs held by slaves. In the Census of 1666, for example, slaves are merely identified as "domestic engagé" while the profession of other family members are specified to the reader. Luckily, some legal documents did provide information on the status of a slave, the nature of their tasks and sometimes, their hobbies and interests. For example, a smuggling trial in 1712 involving a free native slave named Joseph was recorded, providing a fascinating window into the world of free slave populations in Montreal. The legal document mentions that Joseph spent most of his days trading and negotiating with other free slaves from his neighborhood and that he had access to his slave-owner's canoe and sometimes travelled to the Pays d'en Haut with his native friends. Although it may not be a substantial amount of information, knowing that Joseph had friends and was able to have close relationships outside of his household humanizes him.

Occasionally, testimonies and wills provide a glimpse into the intimate relationships between indigenous (or black) slaves and their owners. In 1721, a widow named Marie Claire Catoire wrote a will in which she confirmed her conditional manumission of her native slave Suzanne in exchange for the slave's servitude to her and her son Leonard for the remainder of their lives. Although Suzanne fulfilled this condition, Catoire added another condition to her slave's liberation: that Suzanne and her husband were "to practice the Roman Catholic religion and comport themselves as free persons of the French nation." Efforts to "frenchify" indigenous or black slaves through clothing or conversion was not uncommon during the seventeenth and eighteenth centuries. For example, in 1731 a widow by the name of Marie LeRoy wrote a will expressing that her sauvagesse be given her "'habit de crepon', several 'aulnes' of white cloth with which might make 'coeffes', and a 'jupon' so that she might remember her for the remainder of her life, and live in Christian fashion".

Personal history of slaves

Pierre was one of the first recorded slaves in New France. In 1690, he appeared on the official hospital records at the age of 15. Between 1690 and 1692, his Jesuit master who identified Pierre as his "domestic" placed him twice in the care of the hospital. He was of Panis origin; initially captured in the Illinois territories, he belonged to the Jesuit missionaries of Quebec.

Marie-Joachim was an enslaved Mesquaki (Fox) Indian who belonged to Julien Trottier dit Desrivieres, a wealthy merchant of Montreal. She was brought to Montreal as a slave around 1712 but only appeared in official records in 1725 at the age of 22 due to her involvement in a criminal trial. She was accused of stealing trade goods from her master's warehouse with the intention of giving them to her French lover. While she was sentenced to have her hands cut off, she was sold, instead to a master in Quebec City where she worked as a domestic slave. She eventually died a few years later in her late 20s.

Marie-Marguerite was an enslaved Plains Indian who belonged to Marc-Antoine Huard de Dormicourt, a naval officer from Quebec City. Marie-Marguerite appeared in the record in 1740 in her late twenties when she sued Marc-Antoine Huard de Dormicourt for her freedom. Her trial ignited a debate within the population of New France because she was challenging the legality of her enslavement and forcing inhabitants to question the legal boundaries of slavery. Unfortunately for Marie-Marguerite, however, she lost her appeal and was sent to work on a Caribbean sugar plantation.

Charlotte-Barbe was an enslaved Plains Indian who belonged to Governor Charles de la Boische, Marquis de Beauharnois. Charlotte-Barbe appeared in the record in 1729 when she died at the age of 9. This governor held more than twenty enslaved natives at various times during his tenure.

Marie-Joseph Angélique was one of New France's most well known slaves. While pregnant, she set her mistress' house on fire for revenge or to divert the attention away from her escape. She ran away with the father of her child, who was also a black slave and belonged to another owner. The fire that she started ended up burning part of Montreal and a large portion of the Hôtel-Dieu. Later on she was caught and sentenced to death.

Marie Louise is a famous figure for black slaves in New France but more specifically on Ile Royale. She was the third enslaved woman to be freed on the island. On 21 January 1754, she married 25-year-old Louis Coustard who had arrived to Louisbourg three years earlier from the port of LaRochelle in France. He was the only white man to marry a black slave on Ile Royale. Prior to her marriage, Marie Louise had given birth to 7 illegitimate children, all of whom had to become slaves because she had not yet been free. With Louis she gave birth to two children, both of whom inherited free status from their father.

Road to abolition
A side effect of the 1763 Treaty of Paris was that Panis enslavement in North America greatly diminished and eventually disappeared at the turn of the century, most likely due to harsh economic conditions. In 1793, importing black slaves became prohibited in Upper Canada, forty years before the British government passed the 1833 Slavery Abolition Act, which abolished the institution of slavery throughout the British Empire.

See also
Indentured servitude in the Americas
Indentured servitude in Pennsylvania
Indentured servitude in Virginia
Redemptioner
Slavery among the indigenous peoples of the Americas
Indian slave trade in the American Southeast
Slavery in the colonial United States

References

Slavery in Canada
Slavery in the United States
History of slavery in Louisiana
Louisiana (New France)
History of slavery in Texas
French Texas